Horace Leslie Weeks (11 November 1895 – 5 September 1962) was an Australian rules footballer who played with Richmond in the Victorian Football League (VFL).

Notes

External links 

1895 births
1962 deaths
Australian rules footballers from Geelong
Richmond Football Club players
Australian military personnel of World War I
Military personnel from Victoria (Australia)